Phonons can scatter through several mechanisms as they travel through the material. These scattering mechanisms are: Umklapp phonon-phonon scattering, phonon-impurity scattering, phonon-electron scattering, and phonon-boundary scattering. Each scattering mechanism can be characterised by a relaxation rate 1/ which is the inverse of the corresponding relaxation time.

All scattering processes can be taken into account using Matthiessen's rule. Then the combined relaxation time  can be written as:

Phonon-phonon scattering
For phonon-phonon scattering, effects by normal processes (processes which conserve the phonon wave vector - N processes) are ignored in favor of Umklapp processes (U processes).

Three-phonon and four-phonon process

Thermal transport in non-metal solids was usually considered to be governed by the three-phonon scattering process, and the role of four-phonon and higher-order scattering processes was believed to be negligible. Recent studies have shown that the four-phonon scattering can be important for nearly all materials at high temperature  and for certain materials at room temperature. The predicted significance of four-phonon scattering in boron arsenide was confirmed by experiments.

Mass-difference impurity scattering
Mass-difference impurity scattering is given by:

where  is a measure of the impurity scattering strength. Note that  is dependent of the dispersion curves.

Boundary scattering
Boundary scattering is particularly important for low-dimensional nanostructures and its relaxation rate is given by:

where  is the characteristic length of the system and  represents the fraction of specularly scattered phonons. The  parameter is not easily calculated for an arbitrary surface. For a surface characterized by a root-mean-square roughness , a wavelength-dependent value for  can be calculated using

where  is the angle of incidence. At normal incidence, perfectly specular scattering (i.e. ) would require an arbitrarily large wavelength, or conversely an arbitrarily small roughness. Purely specular scattering does not introduce a boundary-associated increase in the thermal resistance. In the diffusive limit, however, at  the relaxation rate becomes

This equation is also known as Casimir limit.

These phenomenological equations can in many cases accurately model the thermal conductivity of isotropic nano-structures with characteristic sizes on the order of the phonon mean free path. More detailed calculations are in general required to fully capture the phonon-boundary interaction across all relevant vibrational modes in an arbitrary structure.

Phonon-electron scattering

Phonon-electron scattering can also contribute when the material is heavily doped. The corresponding relaxation time is given as:

The parameter  is conduction electrons concentration, ε is deformation potential, ρ is mass density and m* is effective electron mass. It is usually assumed that contribution to thermal conductivity by phonon-electron scattering is negligible .

See also
 Lattice scattering
 Umklapp scattering
 Electron-longitudinal acoustic phonon interaction

References

Condensed matter physics
Scattering